Le Brouère is a French cheese, originally from Lorraine. It is made by the dairy of the Bulgnéville hermitage in Vosges département. It is shaped in wooden molds with patterns created by an artisan sculptor. Maturation time is 4 to 7 months. It is considered a variant of Gruyère.

A wheel was placed into orbit on December 8, 2010, on board the SpaceX Dragon capsule in a tribute to Monty Python's cheese shop sketch.

References 

French cheeses
Vosges